Papy may refer to:
 Papı, a village in the Jabrayil Rayon of Azerbaijan
 Papy (2009 film), a film directed by Djo Tunda Wa Munga
 Papy (2022 film), a Russian children's comedy-drama film

See also
 Pappy